South Korean boy band Big Bang have released eight studio albums, eight extended plays, two reissues, eight compilation albums, ten live albums, seven single albums, and 36 singles. As of May 2017, the group has sold over 4.3 million physical albums in South Korea and Japan alone.

BigBang's debut studio album, which was released in December 2006, sold over 150,000 copies in South Korea. It spawned several singles, including "La La La" and "A Fool's Only Tears". The group achieved commercial success with "Lies", the lead single of their first extended play, Always (2007), which topped the Melon Chart for six consecutive weeks. Their second and third extended plays followed their predecessor's success; Hot Issue (2007) yielded "Last Farewell" while Stand Up (2008) spawned "Day by Day", which topped the Melon Chart for eight and seven consecutive weeks, respectively. Their second studio album, Remember (2008), was also a commercial success and yielded two hit singles in South Korea, "Sunset Glow" and "Strong Baby", with the latter being performed solely by member Seungri.

The group ventured into the Japanese market with two extended plays, For the World (2008) and With U (2008), as well as two studio albums, Number 1 (2009) and Big Bang (2009).

They resumed their activities in South Korea in early 2009, with the release of the song "Lollipop" with their labelmate 2NE1, which was used to promote the LG Cyon's Lollipop phone. The song topped various online charts in South Korea and became an instant viral hit.

In February 2011, BigBang returned to the Korean music scene after two years of hiatus with the release of their fourth Korean extended play, Tonight, which became their first number-one album on the Gaon Album Chart, which was established one year prior. The EP spawned a chart-topping single of the same name and was reissued as a repackaged album under the title Big Bang Special Edition, which spawned "Love Song", their second number-one hit on the Gaon Digital Chart. Later in the same year, BigBang released their second Japanese studio album, Big Bang 2 (2011), which topped the daily and weekly Oricon Albums Charts and was certified gold by the RIAJ. Two singles from the album, "Koe o Kikasete" and "Tell Me Goodbye", also received the same certification.

In 2012, BigBang released their fifth Korean extended play, Alive, which made the group the first ever Korean act to chart on the Billboard 200 with an album purely in the Korean language, debuting at number 150. The EP's lead single, "Blue", quickly topped all major music charts in South Korea while the next two singles, "Bad Boy" and "Fantastic Baby", charted at number two and three on the Gaon Digital Chart, respectively. All three singles from Alive charted separately at number three on the Billboard World Song Sales chart. The EP was later reissued under the title Still Alive (2012), which spawned the single "Monster", their fourth number-one hit on the Gaon Digital Chart.

After a three-year hiatus, BigBang made their comeback in mid-2015 by releasing four singles from their first studio album in eight years, Made (2016). All songs from the album charted within the top three positions on the Billboard World Digital Song Sales chart (with the exception of "Girlfriend"), with three songs topping the chart ("Loser", "Bang Bang Bang", and "Let's Not Fall In Love"), and each track placed within the top three on the Gaon Digital Chart, with five songs peaking at number one.

BigBang's final release as a five-member group, "Flower Road", topped both the Gaon Digital Chart and the Billboard World Digital Song Sales chart in March 2018. It was eventually certified platinum by the Korea Music Content Association.

Albums

Studio albums

Reissues

Compilation albums

Live albums

Single albums

Box sets 
{| class="wikitable plainrowheaders" style="text-align:center;"
|+ List of box sets
! scope="col" style="width:14em;"| Title
! scope="col" style="width:15em;"| Album details
! scope="col" style="width:35.8em;"| Notes
! class="unsortable"| 
|-
! scope="row"| BIGBANG10 The Vinyl LP:Limited Edition
|
 Released: October 13, 2016
 Label: YG Entertainment
 Format: 7-inch record
|
 
| style="text-align:center"| 
|-
! scope="row"| ''BIGBANG10 The Collection –'A to Z|
 Released: October 25, 2016
 Label: YG Entertainment
 Format: Photo-book
|
 
| style="text-align:center"| 
|}

 Extended plays 

 Singles 
As lead artist
2000s

2010s

2020s

 Promotional singles 

 Other charted songs 

 See also 

 List of songs recorded by Big Bang
 Big Bang videographyIndividual discographies G-Dragon
 Taeyang
 T.O.P
 Daesung
 SeungriSub-units'''
 GD & TOP discography
 GD X TAEYANG discography

Notes

References

External links
 Official Site

Discographies of South Korean artists
K-pop music group discographies
Discography